KSGA may refer to:

 16S rRNA (adenine1518-N6/adenine1519-N6)-dimethyltransferase, an enzyme
 KSGA-LD, a low-power television station (channel 3, virtual 3) licensed to serve Los Angeles, California, United States